Tencent Binhai Mansion, or Tencent Seafront Towers, are twin skyscrapers in Houhai, Nanshan District, Shenzhen, China.  Construction of the buildings started in 2012. They were topped out in February 2015 and fully completed by the first half of 2017. The buildings are owned by Tencent, one of the largest Chinese technology and Internet companies, the world's largest investment, gaming and entertainment conglomerate, and Asia's most valuable company. Situated at the intersection of Binhai and Nanhai Boulevards, the buildings stand 248 and 194 meters tall, with 50 and 41 floors respectively. There are three skybridges connecting the two towers.

The building has received two awards for its unique architecture.

See also
List of tallest buildings in Shenzhen

References

Nanshan District, Shenzhen
Skyscraper office buildings in Shenzhen